This is an incomplete list of organisations which campaign on human rights in China.

Organisations with central focus on human rights in China 
Human Rights in China
Chinese Human Rights Defenders
China Human Rights Lawyers Concern Group

International organisations including focus on human rights in China 
Amnesty International
Human Rights Watch

Others 
Radio Free Asia

See also
Human Rights in China
Chinese Intelligence Operations in the United States

References 

Human rights in China
Human rights organizations